Atlantic League may refer to one of the following professional sports leagues:

 Atlantic League (1896–1900), a professional baseball league active from 1896 to 1900
 Atlantic League (1914), a professional baseball league active in 1914
 Atlantic League (1994–1996), one of the ice hockey leagues that formed the Six Nations Tournament
 Atlantic League of Professional Baseball, an independent professional baseball league founded in 1998
 Atlantic League (football), a proposed European association football competition